Chatham Islands / Tuuta Airport  is an airport  northeast of Waitangi Township on the Chatham Islands, New Zealand.

The airport, in part named in honour of the Chatham islander, Inia William Tuuta, who gifted the land for the airport, was completed in 1982 to replace a compacted grass airstrip at Te Hapupu that could only handle slow-flying Safe Air Bristol Freighter aircraft. The Armstrong Whitworth Argosy immediately started operating to the islands using the new airport until 1990, when Mount Cook Airlines and later Air Chathams took over air services to and from mainland New Zealand.

A small aviation museum is also based there, signifying the importance that aviation has played in developing the economic wealth of the island group.

Air Chathams operates services to Auckland, Christchurch, and Wellington. The airport is the base of Air Chathams and usually houses two aircraft overnight.

Improvements proposed

In 2012 the New Zealand Government announced plans to develop the airport as part of an overall Economic Plan for the Chatham Islands. Proposals include and extension out to 5250 feet (1600 metres) and resurfacing of the runway. A new passenger and administration terminal is also planned along with a larger apron area and a new large aircraft hangar.

Airlines and destinations

Passenger

References

Airports in New Zealand
Chatham Islands
Chatham Island